John Coefield (June 18, 1869 – February 8, 1940) was an American labor union leader.

Born in Franklin, Pennsylvania, Coefield completed an apprenticeship as a plumber.  He worked in various cities before settling in San Francisco, where he joined the Plumbers', Gas Fitters', and Steam Fitters' Association.  In 1903, this union affiliated to the United Association of Journeymen Plumbers, Gas Fitters, Steam Fitters, and Steam Fitters' Helpers of the United States and Canada (UA).

In 1907, Coefield became business agent of the San Francisco Building Trades Council, and vice president of the California Building Trades Council.  He became a vice-president of the UA in 1911, and then in 1919 became its president, relocating to Chicago.  From 1920, he was also a vice-president of the Metal Trades Department, and in 1929, he became a vice-president of the American Federation of Labor.

Coefield was a supporter of the Republican Party, and served as labor chair of the Republican National Committee on several occasions.  He died suddenly in 1940, in New York City, after attending a dinner; when found, his body had been robbed.

References

1869 births
1940 deaths
American trade union leaders
People from Franklin, Pennsylvania
Trade unionists from Pennsylvania